Prince Birabongse Bhanudej Bhanubandh (15 July 191423 December 1985), better known as Prince Bira of Siam (now Thailand) or by his nom de course B. Bira, was a member of the Thai royal family, racing driver, sailor, and pilot.

Birabongse raced in Formula One and Grand Prix races for the Maserati, Gordini, and Connaught teams. He was the only Southeast Asian driver to compete in Formula One until Malaysia's Alex Yoong joined Minardi in 2001, and the only Thai driver to compete in Formula One until Alexander Albon made his debut in 2019. Birabongse also competed in sailing events at four Summer Olympic Games, and flew from London to Bangkok in his own twin-engine Miles Gemini aircraft in 1952.

Early life
Prince Birabongse's parents were Prince Bhanurangsi Savangwongse and his second wife. Birabongse's paternal grandfather was King Mongkut, loosely portrayed in the Hollywood movies The King and I and Anna and the King. His mother died when Prince Birabongse was only four years old. Birabongse was sent to Europe in 1927 to complete his education in England at Eton College, where he joined one of his nephews, a grandchild of his father through his first marriage. While he was at Eton Bira's father died, leaving him an orphan. He was placed under the care of his cousin, Prince Chula Chakrabongse, who ultimately became Prince Bira's legal guardian. On leaving Eton at age 18, in early 1933, Prince Bira moved in with Prince Chula in London, while he decided on his future.

Prince Birabongse had been registered to attend Trinity College, Cambridge, but had not passed the Cambridge University entrance examination. Initially, Prince Chula hired a tutor for Prince Bira, to better prepare him for the exam, but Prince Bira changed his mind and expressed a desire to learn sculpture rather than attend university. Prince Chula approached leading sculptor Charles Wheeler, and Wheeler took Prince Bira on as a pupil within his studio. Although Prince Bira showed some talent as a sculptor, in Wheeler's opinion he needed to learn to draw, and so in the autumn of 1934 Prince Bira enrolled at the Byam Shaw School of Art. Prince Birabongse did not attend the Byam Shaw School for very long, but while there he became friendly with a fellow student, Ceril Heycock, and he began courting her in earnest only a few weeks later. However, both Prince Chula and her parents placed severe limitations on their relationship, and it was not until 1938 that they were able to marry.

Auto racing

Bira first raced with his cousin Prince Chula's team, White Mouse Racing, driving a Riley Imp at Brooklands in 1935. In this car Bira established the national motor racing colours of Siam: pale blue with yellow. He later lived near Geneva, Switzerland, and in the south of France.

Later in 1935, Prince Chula gave him one of the new ERA voiturette racing cars—R2B, which was nicknamed Romulus. Bira finished second in his first ever race in Romulus, despite needing to stop for repairs. The remaining races of the season saw Bira consistently placing among the more powerful Grand Prix vehicles, with another second place, and fifth at the Donington Grand Prix.

For 1936 the princes decided that the previous season's results merited a second ERA. They purchased chassis R5B (which Bira named Remus) to use in British events and retained Romulus for international races. Chula also purchased a Maserati 8CM to complete the White Mouse roster. Bira's expertise behind the wheel earned him the Coupe de Prince Rainier at Monte Carlo. Bira won a further four races in the ERAs that season, and took the Grand Prix Maserati to 5th at Donington and 3rd at Brooklands. This was the high point for Bira and the White Mouse team.

Following Dick Seaman's move to Mercedes for 1937, the Thais purchased his Grand Prix Delage and all of its spare parts, along with a second Delage. Despite several upgrades, and hiring experienced race engineer and future Jaguar team manager Lofty England, the cars underperformed, and on many occasions Bira raced in the older and by now substantially inferior ERAs. In addition, the money spent on the Delage upgrades had sapped the resources of the team and corners were being cut in the ERA's race preparations. Later in the year White Mouse did invest in a newer C-Type ERA, chassis R12C. R12C came to be known as Hanuman, and Bira attached a large, embossed, silver badge depicting the Hindu deity after whom he had named the car. Following a major accident in 1939 Hanuman was rebuilt back to B-Type specifications, and in light of this major overhaul Bira renamed the car Hanuman II.

While Bira maintained a respectable results tally in British events, the more costly international races were largely a disaster.

After the war, Bira returned to racing with several teams. In 1951 he raced in an old Maserati 4CLT fitted with a newer V12 Osca engine. No results were obtained this year as a result of the poor performance of the car combined with a severe accident. By 1954, with a newer car, a Maserati 250F, he won the Grand Prix des Frontières on the Chimay road circuit and then finished fourth in the 1954 French Grand Prix with his own Maserati. In January 1955, he won the New Zealand Grand Prix at Ardmore; he retired at the end of that season.

Sailing

Bira competed in sailing events at the 1956 Melbourne Olympics in the Star, 1960 Rome Olympics in the Star, 1964 Tokyo Olympics in the Dragon and the 1972 Munich Olympics in the Tempest. In the 1960 Games he competed against another former Formula One driver, Roberto Mieres, who finished seventeenth, ahead of the prince at nineteenth.

Death

Prince Bira died at Barons Court tube station in London on 23 December 1985. He collapsed and died having suffered a major heart attack, but as he carried no identification with him, his body could not initially be identified. A handwritten note was found in his pocket by the Metropolitan Police and was sent for analysis at the University of London, where it was shown as being written in Thai and addressed to Prince Bira. The Thai Embassy was notified, and realised his significance. A Thai funeral service was held at the Wat Buddhapadipa in Wimbledon, and he was later cremated according to Thai and Buddhist tradition and customs.

Other honors
Bira Circuit, based just outside Pattaya, Thailand, is named after Prince Bira.

In 2016, in an academic paper that reported a mathematical modeling study that assessed the relative influence of driver and machine, Prince Bira was ranked the forty-third best Formula One driver of all time.

Development of the Thai racing colours
Prince Bira was instrumental in developing and setting the national racing colours of Thailand. The base colour for the scheme, a mid to pale powder blue, was adopted by Bira in 1934, and was derived from the evening dress of a young woman that Bira met during his early years in London. Initially the cars were painted solely in blue, but gradually Bira added in some yellow to offset the base colour. He started painting the cars' chassis rails yellow in 1939.

Racing record

Complete European Championship results
(key) (Races in bold indicate pole position) (Races in italics indicate fastest lap)

Notes
 – As a co-driver Bira was ineligible for championship points

Complete 24 Hours of Le Mans results

Post WWII Grandes Épreuves results
(key) (Races in bold indicate pole position; races in italics indicate fastest lap)

Complete Formula One World Championship results
(key)

Non-championship Formula One results
(key) (Races in bold indicate pole position; races in italics indicate fastest lap)

Ancestry

References

External links

 Bira, the Grand Prix driver text: Autocourse site
 Malcolm Campbell and Prince Bira photo: The Brooklands Society site
 pre-war pictures many photos: The Brooklands Society site
 His personal life text.
 A brief biography grandprix.com
 Snellman, L. 2000. The Prince and I, 8W.
 Prince Bira at The Crittenden Automotive Library , full F1 race-by-race statistics
 Bira International Circuit
 "Blue Wings to Bangkok" written by Prince Bira 1953

1914 births
1985 deaths
Birabongse Bhanudej
20th-century Chakri dynasty
Birabongse Bhanudej
Birabongse Bhanudej
Birabongse Bhanudej
Thai sculptors
Enrico Platé Formula One drivers
Gordini Formula One drivers
Connaught Formula One drivers
Scuderia Milano Formula One drivers
Maserati Formula One drivers
Grand Prix drivers
24 Hours of Le Mans drivers
BRDC Gold Star winners
Brighton Speed Trials people
Birabongse Bhanudej
Brooklands people
World Sportscar Championship drivers
Birabongse Bhanudej
Royal Olympic participants
Birabongse Bhanudej
Sailors at the 1956 Summer Olympics – Star
Sailors at the 1960 Summer Olympics – Star
Sailors at the 1964 Summer Olympics – Dragon
Sailors at the 1972 Summer Olympics – Tempest
Asian Games medalists in sailing
Sailors at the 1970 Asian Games
Medalists at the 1970 Asian Games
Birabongse Bhanudej
Thai male Mom Chao